Gordon Owen (born 14 June 1959) is an English former professional footballer who made 300 appearances in the Football League.

Career

A much travelled player, Owen was born in Barnsley and began his career at Sheffield Wednesday, featuring in the club's promotion winning season under Jack Charlton in 1979–80. After falling out of favour at the club, spending spells on loan at Rotherham United, Doncaster Rovers and Chesterfield, he left to sign for Cardiff City in August 1983. His only season at Ninian Park saw him finish as the club's top scorer with 18 goals in all competitions but at the end of the season he decided to leave the club as he wanted to return north, signing for his hometown side Barnsley, again finishing as top scorer in his first season.

Owen left Barnsley the following year, signing for Bristol City where he played over 50 times before, after a short loan spell at Hull City, he signed for Mansfield Town. He would later finish his professional career at Blackpool, having loan spells at Carlisle United and Exeter City while at the club, before moving into non-league football.

References

External links

1959 births
Living people
Footballers from Barnsley
English footballers
Association football wingers
Sheffield Wednesday F.C. players
Rotherham United F.C. players
Doncaster Rovers F.C. players
Chesterfield F.C. players
Cardiff City F.C. players
Barnsley F.C. players
Bristol City F.C. players
Hull City A.F.C. players
Mansfield Town F.C. players
Blackpool F.C. players
Carlisle United F.C. players
Exeter City F.C. players
English Football League players